Eyes of the Underworld is a 1942 American film noir crime film directed by Roy William Neill starring Richard Dix, Wendy Barrie and Lon Chaney Jr.

Plot

Cast
 Richard Dix as Police Chief Richard Bryan  
 Wendy Barrie as Betty Standing  
 Lon Chaney Jr. as Benny  
 Lloyd Corrigan as J.C. Thomas  
 Don Porter as Edward Jason  
 Billy Lee as Mickey Bryan  
 Marc Lawrence as Gordon Finch  
 Edward Pawley as Lance Merlin  
 Joseph Crehan as Kirby - Assistant Police Chief  
 Wade Boteler as Sergeant Clancy  
 Steve Pendleton as Hub Gelsey 
 Mike Raffetto as District Attorney Fred
 Sonny Bupp as Boy (uncredited)

References

Bibliography
 Weaver, Tom & Brunas, Michael & Brunas, John. Universal Horrors: The Studio's Classic Films, 1931-1946. McFarland & Company, 2007.

External links
 

1942 films
1942 crime films
American crime films
Films directed by Roy William Neill
American black-and-white films
Universal Pictures films
Films scored by Hans J. Salter
1940s English-language films
1940s American films